The Art McNally Award is an annual award created in 2002 by the then National Football League (NFL) Commissioner, Paul Tagliabue, and given to an NFL game official who exhibits exemplary professionalism, leadership, and commitment to sportsmanship,  on and off the field.  This award is presented at the Pro Bowl.

The award is named after Art McNally, an NFL game official from 1959 to 1967 and Supervisor of Officials from 1968 to 1990.  Since 1996, he has served as an assistant supervisor of officials in the NFL during the season. Tagliabue said of McNally, "Art McNally truly represented the qualities that are inscribed on the award.  His dedication to the game and his professionalism and class on and off the field set the standard."

Award winners
Awards are formally presented the day of the Pro Bowl game.

See also
List of NFL officials
List of National Football League awards

References

National Football League trophies and awards
+
Awards established in 2002
2002 establishments in the United States
Sportsmanship trophies and awards